Hyomin is a South Korean singer, songwriter and actress. She debuted as a singer with T-ara in 2009 and has since been active in the entertainment industry. Her first major acting project was My Girlfriend is a Nine-Tailed Fox as Ban Sun-Nyeon the drama saw huge success during its run and helped develop Hyomin's acting career.

Hyomin is mostly known for her roles in the period drama Gye Baek (2011) as Cho-young, horror film Ghastly (2011) as Yu-Rin and Japanese film Jinx!!! (2013) as Yoon Ji-ho.

Film

Television series

Web series

Television shows

Music videos

Hosting

Musical

Narration

Advertising

External links 
 Hyomin Profile (Han Cinema)

References 

South Korean filmographies